The North East constituency (No.214) is a Russian legislative constituency in Saint Petersburg. Initially created in 1993, North East constituency covered northeastern Saint Petersburg but 1995 it was sacrificed to create Eastern constituency. However, North East constituency was restored in 2016 from parts of Eastern and Northern constituencies.

Members elected

Election results

1993

|-
! colspan=2 style="background-color:#E9E9E9;text-align:left;vertical-align:top;" |Candidate
! style="background-color:#E9E9E9;text-align:left;vertical-align:top;" |Party
! style="background-color:#E9E9E9;text-align:right;" |Votes
! style="background-color:#E9E9E9;text-align:right;" |%
|-
|style="background-color:"|
|align=left|Yuly Rybakov
|align=left|Independent
|
|24.71%
|-
|style="background-color:"|
|align=left|Mikhail Ivanov
|align=left|Liberal Democratic Party
| -
|10.42%
|-
| colspan="5" style="background-color:#E9E9E9;"|
|- style="font-weight:bold"
| colspan="3" style="text-align:left;" | Total
| 
| 100%
|-
| colspan="5" style="background-color:#E9E9E9;"|
|- style="font-weight:bold"
| colspan="4" |Source:
|
|}

2016

|-
! colspan=2 style="background-color:#E9E9E9;text-align:left;vertical-align:top;" |Candidate
! style="background-color:#E9E9E9;text-align:leftt;vertical-align:top;" |Party
! style="background-color:#E9E9E9;text-align:right;" |Votes
! style="background-color:#E9E9E9;text-align:right;" |%
|-
|style="background-color: " |
|align=left|Yelena Drapeko
|align=left|A Just Russia
|
|34.46%
|-
|style="background:"| 
|align=left|Mikhail Amosov
|align=left|Yabloko
|
|12.56%
|-
|style="background-color:"|
|align=left|Yury Gatchin
|align=left|Communist Party
|
|10.82%
|-
|style="background-color:"|
|align=left|Yegor Tratnikov
|align=left|Liberal Democratic Party
|
|10.76%
|-
|style="background:"| 
|align=left|Irina Komolova
|align=left|Party of Growth
|
|9.75%
|-
|style="background:"| 
|align=left|Fyodor Turkin
|align=left|Patriots of Russia
|
|4.74%
|-
|style="background-color:"|
|align=left|Andrey Petrov
|align=left|Rodina
|
|3.38%
|-
|style="background:"| 
|align=left|Andrey Pivovarov
|align=left|People's Freedom Party
|
|3.18%
|-
|style="background:"| 
|align=left|Olga Panyuta
|align=left|Communists of Russia
|
|2.38%
|-
|style="background:"| 
|align=left|Ivan Doktorov
|align=left|Civic Platform
|
|1.32%
|-
|style="background:#00A650"| 
|align=left|Mikhail Kontorin
|align=left|Civilian Power
|
|0.55%
|-
| colspan="5" style="background-color:#E9E9E9;"|
|- style="font-weight:bold"
| colspan="3" style="text-align:left;" | Total
| 
| 100%
|-
| colspan="5" style="background-color:#E9E9E9;"|
|- style="font-weight:bold"
| colspan="4" |Source:
|
|}

2021

|-
! colspan=2 style="background-color:#E9E9E9;text-align:left;vertical-align:top;" |Candidate
! style="background-color:#E9E9E9;text-align:left;vertical-align:top;" |Party
! style="background-color:#E9E9E9;text-align:right;" |Votes
! style="background-color:#E9E9E9;text-align:right;" |%
|-
|style="background-color:"|
|align=left|Yelena Drapeko (incumbent)
|align=left|A Just Russia — For Truth
|
|31.50%
|-
|style="background-color:"|
|align=left|Yelena Rakhova
|align=left|United Russia
|
|23.91%
|-
|style="background-color:"|
|align=left|Dmitry Dmitriyev
|align=left|Communist Party
|
|11.78%
|-
|style="background-color: "|
|align=left|Dmitry Medvedev
|align=left|New People
|
|7.55%
|-
|style="background-color:"|
|align=left|Dmitry Nesterov
|align=left|Liberal Democratic Party
|
|5.37%
|-
|style="background-color:"|
|align=left|Kirill Strakhov
|align=left|Yabloko
|
|5.23%
|-
|style="background-color: "|
|align=left|Anton Shatilov
|align=left|Party of Pensioners
|
|3.53%
|-
|style="background-color: "|
|align=left|Olga Panyuta
|align=left|Communists of Russia
|
|3.18%
|-
|style="background-color:"|
|align=left|Andrey Samonov
|align=left|Rodina
|
|1.92%
|-
|style="background-color:"|
|align=left|Sergey Myasishchev
|align=left|Green Alternative
|
|1.90%
|-
| colspan="5" style="background-color:#E9E9E9;"|
|- style="font-weight:bold"
| colspan="3" style="text-align:left;" | Total
| 
| 100%
|-
| colspan="5" style="background-color:#E9E9E9;"|
|- style="font-weight:bold"
| colspan="4" |Source:
|
|}

Notes

References

Russian legislative constituencies
Politics of Saint Petersburg